24th NSFC Awards
January 8, 1990

Best Film: 
 Drugstore Cowboy 
The 24th National Society of Film Critics Awards, given on 8 January 1990, honored the best filmmaking of 1989.

Winners

Best Picture 
1. Drugstore Cowboy
2. Enemies, a Love Story
3. Casualties of War

Best Director 
1. Gus Van Sant – Drugstore Cowboy
2. Paul Mazursky – Enemies, a Love Story
3. Spike Lee – Do the Right Thing

Best Actor 
1. Daniel Day-Lewis – My Left Foot
2. Morgan Freeman – Driving Miss Daisy
3. Tom Cruise – Born on the Fourth of July

Best Actress 
1. Michelle Pfeiffer – The Fabulous Baker Boys
2. Jessica Tandy – Driving Miss Daisy
3. Andie MacDowell – Sex, Lies, and Videotape

Best Supporting Actor 
1. Beau Bridges – The Fabulous Baker Boys
2. Denzel Washington – Glory

Best Supporting Actress 
1. Anjelica Huston – Enemies, a Love Story
2. Lena Olin – Enemies, a Love Story
3. Brenda Fricker – My Left Foot

Best Screenplay 
1. Gus Van Sant and Daniel Yost – Drugstore Cowboy
2. Steven Soderbergh – Sex, Lies, and Videotape
3. Steve Kloves – The Fabulous Baker Boys

Best Cinematography 
Michael Ballhaus – The Fabulous Baker Boys

Best Documentary 
Roger & Me

References

External links
Past Awards

1989
National Society of Film Critics Awards
National Society of Film Critics Awards
National Society of Film Critics Awards